Applehead may refer to

 Applehead (candy), an American brand of candy, produced by the Ferrara Candy Company
 Applehead (cat), a type of Siamese cat
 Applehead (dog), a type of Chihuahua dog 
 Michael Jackson's nickname